Paksat-1R (or Paksat-1 Replacement) is a geosynchronous, communications satellite that was manufactured by China Great Wall Industry Corporation (CGWIC)  and operated by the Space and Upper Atmosphere Research Commission (SUPARCO), an executive space authority of the Government of Pakistan.

History 
In December 2001, the SUPARCO negotiated to lease the Palapa-C1 satellite and designated it as Paksat-1 in an attempt to avert the 
orbital position crises. It was acquired after an anomaly in the electrical system of the satellite on 24 November 1998. A module for controlling the hydro accumulators had failed and an American contractor, Hughes Global Services (HGS), managed to develop a strategy that allowed the continued use of the satellite in geostationary orbit. The satellite was eventually leased by Pakistan as Paksat-1 at 38° East in geostationary orbit and had been active since December 2002. During this time, the SUPARCO began developing the geosynchronous satellite to replacing the aging Paksat-1 as part of the new space policy announced by the government of Pakistan in 2008.

Prototype 
In 2008, a prototype of Paksat-1R was developed by SUPARCO at its Satellite Research and Development Centre (SRDC) in Lahore. The project was aimed to enhance the knowledge and technical expertise of young scientists and engineers about communications satellite engineering. The Paksat-1R prototype has three C-band transponders as the communication payload. All the subsystems have been designed and developed locally in Pakistan. System integration and testing have also been performed. SUPARCO reported that the project was completed in three years.

Satellite construction 
The PakSat-1R was developed by the China Great Wall Industry Corporation and financial funding came from the Chinese government. Before launching the satellite spent around 18 days undergoing laboratory tests in China. The Paksat-1R was developed and built as a geostationary telecommunications satellite and was launched from Xichang, China, at 16:15:04 UTC on 11 August 2011. Launched on the Long March 3B launch vehicle, the satellite has a design life of 15 years with initial goals to provide broadband internet access, digital television broadcasting, remote and rural telephony, emergency communications, tele-education and tele-medicine services across South Asia and Central Asia, Eastern Europe, East Africa and the Far East. The satellite successfully took over the operations of its predecessor, the Paksat-1 satellite leased by Pakistan, in geostationary orbit at 38° East.

Launch 
The PakSat-1R was launched on 11 August 2011 from the Xichang Satellite Launch Center in Sichuan province, China, by a Long March 3B/E (Chang Zheng-3B/E) launch vehicle. In 2010, China provided loans for setting up communication facilities at the SUPARCO Satellite Ground Station.

Specifications 
The satellite will be positioned at 38° East, replacing the Paksat-1 (1996-006A), which was launched as Palapa-C1 on 1 February 1996, by an Atlas-IIAS (AC-126) from Cape Canaveral's LC-36B launch complex. Paksat-1R was manufactured by the China Great Wall Industry Corporation (CGWIC), after being ordered on 15 October 2008 – with a contract signed with the China Great Wall Industry Corporation (CGWIC). The PakSat-1R contract was the third communications satellite contract signed by China's space industry with international customers. It is also China's first satellite in-orbit delivery contract signed with an Asian customer. The satellite will support all conventional and modern Fixed Satellite Service (FSS) applications, with a total of up to 30 transponders: 18 in Ku-band and 12 in C-band. To ensure high degree of reliability/availability of the system, two fully redundant Satellite Ground Control Stations (SGCS) were established in Karachi and Lahore, one to act as the main and the other as backup respectively.

The DFH-4 (DongFangHong-4) satellite bus is a large telecommunications satellite platform – a new generation of hardware based on high output power and communication capacity, ranking alongside international advanced satellite platforms. The applications for the DFH-4 platform aren't limited to high-capacity broadcast communication satellites and can be used to tracking and data relay satellites, regional mobile communication satellites, etc. The satellite bus comprises propulsion module, service module and solar array. It has a payload capacity of 588 kg and an output power of 10.5 kW by the end of its lifetime. Its design lifetime is 15 years and its reliability by the end of its lifetime is more than 0.78.

Based on versatility, inheritance, expandability and promptness principles and mature technology, the platform will meet the needs of international and domestic large communication satellite markets.
The satellite is equipped with three receiver antennas and two transmission antennas. It can support the transmission of 150-200 television programs simultaneously to ground users using a  antenna device.

Launch 
PAKSAT-1R was launched at 16:15:04 UTC on 11 August 2011 aboard China's Long March 3B (CZ-3B) launch vehicle from the Xichang Satellite Launch Centre in China's Sichuan Province. The launch was witnessed by, among others, Pakistan's Secretary Defence, Lt. Gen. Syed Athar Ali (retd), Secretary Foreign Affairs, Salman Bashir, Director General, Strategic Plans Division, Lt. Gen. Khalid Ahmed Kidwai (retd) and the Ambassador of Pakistan to China, Muhammad Masood Khan.

Reception 
The reception perceived in the Pakistan science community and the country at large was generally positive. However, leading scientists in Pakistan criticised SUPARCO for not being able to launch the satellite from Pakistan's Flight Space Center and questions were raised whether the space programme is on the right track. In a press release, SUPARCO dismissed the concerns and maintained that the program is being directed on its right direction. Commenting on the launch of the satellite, The Tribune wrote that what Space and Upper Atmosphere Research Commission (SUPARCO) achieved could have been done 30 years earlier.

References

External links 
 PAKSAT Official Website
 PAKSAT-1R 
 Pakistan's first satellite to be launched in April 2011 
 PAKSAT-1R Prototype 
 PAKSAT-1R launch date
 SUPARCO to launch Paksat-1R satellite
 New communications satellite PakSat-1R important for many reasons: Khan
 Pakistan's first communications satellite PAKSAT-1R launched

Communications satellites in geostationary orbit
SUPARCO satellites
History of science and technology in Pakistan
Spacecraft launched in 2011
China–Pakistan relations
Communications satellites of Pakistan
Satellites using the DFH-4 bus